Equate Scotland is an organisation established to promote and encourage the advancement of women in science, engineering, technology and the built environment. It is based at Edinburgh Napier University in Scotland.

Equate began in 2006 as the Scottish Resource Centre for Women in Science Engineering and Technology and was the delivery agent in Scotland for the former UK Resource Centre for Women in Science Engineering and Technology (UKRC). When the UKRC's contract with the UK Government expired in 2012, the Scottish Government agreed to fund the Scottish organisation.

In 2014, the Scottish Resource Centre was re-branded to Equate Scotland, to 
"increase awareness of their expertise in gender equality and diversity in these sectors. It will also lead to a clearly defined focus for supporting women and assist employers and academia in science, engineering and technology across Scotland recruit and retain talented female staff" (Alex Salmond, then First Minister of Scotland).

Organisation 
The Project Director of Equate Scotland 2016-2020 was Talat Yaqoob.

Funding 
Equate Scotland is funded by the Scottish Government, receiving £601,000 between 2012-15 to support the recruitment and retention of women in science engineering, technology and the built environment.

Other funders have included the Construction Industry Training Board, Edinburgh Napier University and the Big Lottery Fund.

Events and Activities 
Equate Scotland runs a variety of workshops and events, including:

 Career training and support for women.
 Industry-based advice and training to help improve gender equality and diversity in the workplace.
 Interconnect - a female student network, allowing students to make links with industry.
 Organising industry placements for students.
Equate also contributes to Scottish Government and Scottish Parliament consultations and inquiries.

References

External links 

 

Edinburgh Napier University
Organizations for women in science and technology
Science and technology in Edinburgh